U.S. Highway 77 (US 77) in the state of Nebraska runs south–north across the eastern portion of the state, emerging from Kansas in Gage County south of Wymore, and ending in Dakota County north of South Sioux City, before making a brief entrance into Iowa.

Route description

In Nebraska, US 77 is a major north–south artery connecting the capital city of Lincoln with outlying areas to the north and south. The highway is designated as the Homestead Expressway from Beatrice to Interstate 80 (I-80) at Lincoln. In Lincoln, US 77 becomes a full controlled-access expressway before it overlaps with I-80 for about 8 miles. North of I-80, US 77 continues as an expressway to Wahoo, where it becomes a two-lane undivided road. It remains a two-lane highway except for two sections near Fremont, which are four-lane divided highways. The expressway north of Fremont is shared with US 275 and Nebraska Highway 91 (N-91). US 275 and N-91 separate from US 77 just south of Winslow, Nebraska and US 77 continues north as a two-lane highway until it meets U.S. Route 75 at Winnebago. The two highways run together to the junction of I-129 and US 20 at Dakota City, where US 75 breaks off and US 77 continues northward as a divided highway through South Sioux City before exiting the state via the Siouxland Veterans Memorial Bridge.

Major intersections

References

Transportation in Burt County, Nebraska
Transportation in Dakota County, Nebraska
Transportation in Dodge County, Nebraska
Transportation in Gage County, Nebraska
Transportation in Lancaster County, Nebraska
Transportation in Saunders County, Nebraska
Transportation in Thurston County, Nebraska
77
 Nebraska